Nature Reviews Endocrinology is a monthly peer-reviewed medical journal published by Nature Portfolio. It covers all aspects of endocrinology. The journal was established in 2005 as Nature Clinical Practice Endocrinology & Metabolism and obtained its current title in April 2009. The editor-in-chief is Claire Greenhill.

According to the Journal Citation Reports, the journal has a 2021 impact factor of 47.564, ranking it 1st out of 146 journals in the category "Endocrinology & Metabolism".

References

External links 
 

Nature Research academic journals
Monthly journals
Endocrinology journals
Publications established in 2005
English-language journals
Review journals